Earl R. McCullouch (born January 10, 1946) is a retired American football wide receiver.  McCullouch was the world record holder for the 110 meter men's high hurdle sprint from July 1967 to July 1969. When attending the University of Southern California, McCullouch was a member of the USC Trojan Football teams (wide receiver) and the USC Track & Field teams (120 yard high hurdles and 4×110 sprint relay) in 1967 and 1968. The USC Track 4×110 yard relay team, for which McCullouch ran the start leg, set the world record in 1967 that remains today, as the metric 4 × 100 m relay is now the commonly contested event.

High school career
McCullouch attended Long Beach Polytechnic High School. He tied the national high school record (also held by Don Castronovo from Oceanside High School in Oceanside, New York, and Steve Caminiti from Crespi Carmelite High School in Encino, California) in the 180 yard low hurdles at 18.1. The record was never broken and the event was discontinued in regular high school competition in 1974. He swept both the 120 yard high hurdles and the 180 low hurdles at the CIF California State Meet in 1964 (defeating Caminiti).

In 1964 McCullouch was named Co-Athlete of the Year in the California Interscholastic Federation (CIF) Southern Section by the Helms Athletic Foundation.  He earned the award in conjunction with pole vaulter Paul Wilson.

College career
Next he attended community college and played football at Long Beach City College, before transferring to the University of Southern California.

McCullouch played college football at the University of Southern California, where he was part of the 1967 National Championship team. He was one of five  USC Trojans players taken in the first round of the 1968 NFL Draft after his senior year.  McCullouch was known for having elite sprinter speed and used it on both the track and the football field. Wearing No. 22 during the 1967 and 1968 seasons, McCulloch played wide receiver on an offensive USC Trojan Football squad that featured tailback  O. J. Simpson.  Defensive coverages had difficulty covering McCullouch in pass routes and chasing him after pass completions due to his sprinter's speed. McCullouch also provided down-field blocking on break-away plays, often for 1968  Heisman Trophy winner Simpson.

As a member of the USC Track & Field team, McCulloch was the NCAA 110 Yard High Hurdle champion in 1967 and 1968, the NCAA 60 yard indoor high hurdle champion in 1968, and was the lead leg sprinter of the USC NCAA 4 X 110 yard sprint relay team in 1967 and 1968 (the team also featured Simpson and future Olympian sprinter Lennox Miller).  The USC Trojan sprint relay team (McCulloch, Fred Kuller, Simpson, and Lennox Miller – in order) set a 4 X 110 yard sprint relay world record (38.6 sec.) in the 1967 NCAA Track & Field Championships in Provo, Utah on June 17, 1967.  In the era of metric-distance sprint world records, this world record still stands today and is likely not to be broken.

McCullough was on the cover of the April 1968 issue of Track and Field News.

Professional career
As the world record holder and National Champion in the hurdles, McCullouch was a favorite for the Olympic Gold Medal.  In 1968, the Olympic Trials held a Semi-Final event a week after the National Championships.  There, Campbell hit several hurdles and finished poorly in 7th place.  The final Olympic Trials and Olympics were scheduled for late in the year, September and October respectively, well into the football season.  And while the Olympics meant glory, there was no money to be made in the amateur days of the Olympics.  McCullouch had a tough choice between his two sports.  He chose to enter the NFL draft.  Willie Davenport went on to win both the trials and the Olympics.  A year later, Davenport finally beat McCullouch's world record.

McCullouch was drafted by the Detroit Lions as their second pick of the first round (24th overall).  By the time the Olympic races rolled around, Detroit had already played 5 official games of the regular season and was about to take the lead in the Central Division.  By that time, McCullouch had already amassed 419 yards receiving and scored three touchdowns, including an 80-yard reception, from the Lions' other first round pick Greg Landry, in his first NFL game.  He finished the season with 680 yards receiving, plus another 13 in 3 rushing attempts, 5 touchdowns and a 43-yard per touch average and was named the NFL Rookie of the Year in 1968.  He played 7 seasons for the Lions between 1968 and 1973, then finished off his career with a non-productive season with the New Orleans Saints in 1974.

References

External links
 California State Records before 2000
 Database Football
 NFL.com
 Pro Football Reference
 LBCC Hall of Champions
 The Races of Earl McCullouch (Internet Archive) 
 USC Track

1946 births
Living people
People from Clarksville, Texas
American male hurdlers
American football wide receivers
Athletes (track and field) at the 1967 Pan American Games
USC Trojans men's track and field athletes
USC Trojans football players
Detroit Lions players
New Orleans Saints players
National Football League Offensive Rookie of the Year Award winners
Pan American Games gold medalists for the United States
Pan American Games medalists in athletics (track and field)
World record setters in athletics (track and field)
Track and field athletes from California
Track and field athletes in the National Football League
Long Beach City Vikings football players
Medalists at the 1967 Pan American Games
Long Beach Polytechnic High School alumni